Nacascolo is a district of the Liberia canton, in the Guanacaste province of Costa Rica.

History 
Nacascolo was created on 26 November 1971 by Decreto Ejecutivo 2077-G. Segregated from Liberia.

Geography 
Nacascolo has an area of  km² and an elevation of  metres.

Villages
Administrative center of the district is Guardia. Other villages are Bejuco, Nacascolo, Oratorio, Puerto Culebra and Triunfo.

Demographics 

For the 2011 census, Nacascolo had a population of  inhabitants.

Transportation

Road transportation 
The district is covered by the following road routes:
 National Route 1
 National Route 21
 National Route 253
 National Route 913

References 

Districts of Guanacaste Province
Populated places in Guanacaste Province